Mèo Vạc is a rural district of Hà Giang province in the Northeast region of Vietnam. As of 2019 the district had a population of 86 071 . The district covers an area of 574 km². The district capital lies at Mèo Vạc.

Administrative divisions
Mèo Vạc District consists of the district capital, Mèo Vạc, and 17 communes: Cán Chu Phìn, Giàng Chu Phìn, Khâu Vai, Lũng Chinh, Lũng Pù, Nậm Ban, Niêm Sơn, Pả Vi, Pải Lủng, Sơn Vĩ, Sủng Máng, Sủng Trà, Tả Lủng, Tát Ngà, Thượng Phùng, Xín Cái and Niêm Tòng.

References

Districts of Hà Giang province
Hà Giang province